Yaqoub Husain Al-Tararwa (born 7 March 1994) is a Kuwaiti football player playing for Kuwait SC in the VIVA Premier League and Kuwait national football team playing mainly as a winger and central attacking midfielder.

International career

International goals
Scores and results list Kuwait's goal tally first.

References

Living people
Kuwaiti footballers
1994 births
Kuwait SC players
Association football forwards
Kuwait international footballers
Sportspeople from Kuwait City
Kuwait Premier League players
Kazma SC players
Al Tadhamon SC players